Masonsing Sangma was an Indian politician and member of the Nationalist Congress Party. Sangma was a member of the Meghalaya Legislative Assembly from the Chokpot constituency in South Garo Hills district.

References 

People from South Garo Hills district
Nationalist Congress Party politicians from Meghalaya
Indian National Congress politicians
Living people
Meghalaya politicians
21st-century Indian politicians
Year of birth missing (living people)
Meghalaya MLAs 2003–2008
Meghalaya MLAs 2008–2013
Meghalaya MLAs 1993–1998
Garo people